Tetrahydropapaveroline (norlaudanosoline) is a benzyltetrahydroisoquinoline alkaloid.

It can be formed in trace amounts in the brain by a condensation reaction of dopamine and dopaldehyde (a metabolite of dopamine).

It inhibits dopamine uptake within the cerebral cortex.

References 

Dopamine reuptake inhibitors
Tetrahydroisoquinolines
Catechols